Andrei, Andrey or Andrej (in Cyrillic script: Андрэй , Андрей or Андреј) is a form of Andreas/Ἀνδρέας in Slavic languages and Romanian. People with the name include:

Andrei of Polotsk (–1399), Lithuanian nobleman
Andrei Alexandrescu, Romanian computer programmer
Andrey Amador, Costa Rican cyclist
Andrei Arlovski, Belarusian mixed martial artist
Andrey Arshavin, Russian football player
Andrej Babiš, Czech prime minister 
Andrey Belousov (born 1959), Russian politician
Andrey Bolotov, Russian agriculturalist and memoirist
Andrey Borodin, Russian financial expert and businessman
Andrei Broder, Romanian-Israeli American computer scientist and engineer
Andrei Chikatilo, prolific and cannibalistic Russian serial killer and rapist
Andrei Denisov (weightlifter) (born 1963), Israeli Olympic weightlifter
Andrey Ershov, Russian computer scientist
Andrey Esionov, Russian painter
Andrei Glavina, Istro-Romanian writer and politician
Andrei Gromyko (1909–1989), Belarusian Soviet politician and diplomat
Andrei Iosivas (born 1999), American football player
Andrey Ivanov, several people
Andrei Karlov, Russian diplomat
Andrei Kanchelskis, retired Russian football player
Andrei Kirilenko (basketball), Russian basketball player in the NBA
Andrei Kirilenko (politician), Russian Soviet politician
Andrej Kiska, Slovak president
Andrey Kolmogorov, Russian mathematician
Andrey Korotayev, Russian anthropologist
Andrei Kostitsyn, Belarusian hockey player
Andrej Kramarić, Croatian football player
Andrey Lukanov, Bulgarian politician and former Prime Minister
Andrei Lupan, Moldovan writer
Andrei Netto, Brazilian journalist and writer
Andrei Markov, Russian ice hockey player
Andrey Markov, Russian mathematician
Andrei Mureșanu (1816–1863), Romanian poet and revolutionary
Andrey Osterman, Russian statesman
Andrei Platonov, Russian-born writer of the Soviet period
Andrej Plenković, Croatian premier minister
Andrej Pohar (born 1974), Slovenian badminton player
Andrei Rublev, Russian painter
Andrey Rublev (tennis), Russian tennis player
Andrei Sakharov, Russian physicist and activist, recipient of the Nobel Peace Prize
Andrej Sekera, Slovak hockey player
Andrei Tarkovsky, Russian film director
Andrei Vasilevski, Belarusian tennis player
Andrey Vlasov, Russian general
Andrey Voznesensky, Russian writer
Andrey Vyshinsky, Soviet politician
Andrei Zhdanov, Russian politician
Andrei Zhelyabov, Russian revolutionary

See also
Andrei (surname), a surname

Russian masculine given names
Bulgarian masculine given names
Ukrainian masculine given names